Morinia nigerrima is a species of cluster fly in the family Polleniidae.

Distribution
Japan.

References

Polleniidae
Insects described in 1961
Diptera of Asia